Martin Briggs may refer to:
 Martin Briggs (athlete) (born 1964), British hurdler
 Martin S. Briggs (1882–1977), British architectural historian and author